Parliamentary elections were held in Moldova on 30 November 2014. The result was described as "more a loss than a victory" of the incumbent pro-European coalition, with center-right parties divided by sharp tensions. The pro-Russian Party of Socialists (PSRM), composed of former communists, emerged as the largest party in Parliament, gaining 20.51% of votes and winning 25 of the 101 seats. The Party of Communists of the Republic of Moldova (PCRM), previously the largest party, dropped from 38 to 21 seats.

Electoral system
The 101 members of Parliament were elected by party-list proportional representation in a single nationwide constituency. There were four separate electoral thresholds: 9 percent for electoral blocs with three or more parties, 7 percent for two-party electoral blocs, 4 percent for single parties or organisations, and 2 percent for independent candidates.

Documents for registration of electoral candidates had to be submitted to the Central Electoral Commission (CEC) between 3 and 30 October 2014. Once formally registered by the CEC, the candidates were allowed to begin campaigning.

Voter turnout had to be over 33 percent for the election to be validated.

Campaign

A total of 41 parties registered at the Ministry of Justice by the 15 September deadline, but the final ballot included 19 parties, one bloc, and four independent candidates.

The main dividing line between the parties was foreign policy, setting the pro-European Union (EU) parties (the Democratic Party, the Liberal Democratic Party, and the Liberal Party) against those supporting rapprochement with the then incoming Eurasian Economic Union and the Russian Federation (PCRM and PSRM). The PSRM was the most radical by offering to cancel the agreement on political association and the free trade zone with the EU, and was openly supported by Russia. The leader of the party, Igor Dodon, publicly met with Russian President Vladimir Putin and Deputy Prime Minister Dmitry Rogozin.

Participating
In total, the Central Electoral Commission registered 25 participants in the election (20 political parties, 1 electoral bloc, and 4 independent candidates):

Withdrawn
The candidate list of the Republican Socio-Political Movement Equality was accepted by the Central Electoral Commission (CEC) on 29 October 2014; however, the party later decided to withdraw from the election.  On 22 November 2014, the CEC announced that it had accepted the withdrawal.

The Homeland Party was declared withdrawn from the election by the Chișinău Court of Appeal on 27 November 2014, for having used foreign financial resources during the campaign. Because ballot papers had already been printed, it was too late to remove the party's name (as was previously done for the Socio-political Movement 'Ravnopravie').  Instead, a stamp marked "withdrawn" was applied next to the party's name. The Supreme Court of Justice of Moldova rejected the party's appeal on 29 November 2014.

Opinion polls

Results

References

Moldova
2014 in Moldova
Parliamentary elections in Moldova